Carolijn "Carolyn" Lilipaly (born July 22, 1969) is a Dutch news anchor and actress.

Dutch-Moluccan Carolijn Lilipaly was born in Middelburg. Her father was former Dutch Labour Party parliament member John Lilipaly (1943-2022). After studying law, she became a presenter for MTV Europe in London. Carolyn was the host of MTV Hit List UK, MTV News at Night and The Big Picture. At this time she adopted the name Carolyn so it would be easier pronounced by English speakers. In the five years that she worked for MTV she travelled around the world and interviewed a host of international stars from the world of music and film. Later on she worked as a presenter for CNBC Europe, Net 5 and Canal Plus.

She has a daughter named Josephine, born in 1993.

Carolyn Lilipaly was a news anchor for the Dutch morning news program NOS Journaal from January 2003 through February 2004. High points in her time at NOS included the presentation of a special Journal about the arrest of Saddam Hussein. In the beginning of 2004 she left the NOS and worked for Omroep Zeeland television, where she presented the news. She now runs her own art gallery.

Trivia
 She acted in the 1999 movie The Delivery.
 FHM magazine readers voted her one of the sexiest women in the world for 2001.
 Was married with Belgian singer Koen Wauters.

References

External links
 
 Carolyn Lilipaly Unofficial Fan Site

1969 births
Dutch television news presenters
Dutch people of Indonesian descent
Dutch people of Moluccan descent
Indo people
Dutch film actresses
Living people
People from Middelburg, Zeeland
Women television journalists